Chapels, England may refer to:
Chapels, Cumbria, England
Chapels, Lancashire, England